Kornstad is a former municipality in Møre og Romsdal county, Norway. The municipality existed from 1897 until its dissolution in 1964. The  municipality encompassed the western part oft the present-day Averøy Municipality on the island of Averøya, plus a small area in the present-day Hustadvika Municipality on the mainland Romsdal Peninsula to the west of the island. The administrative centre of the municipality was the village of Kornstad where Kornstad Church is located.

History
The municipality of Kornstad was established on 1 January 1897 when the old Kvernes Municipality was divided. Initially, Kornstad had a population of 1,599. During the 1960s, there were many municipal mergers across Norway due to the work of the Schei Committee. On 1 January 1964, the mainland district of Vevang (population: 562) was transferred into the neighboring Eide Municipality and the rest of Kornstad (population: 1,356) was merged into the newly created Averøy Municipality.

Government
All municipalities in Norway, including Kornstad, are responsible for primary education (through 10th grade), outpatient health services, senior citizen services, unemployment and other social services, zoning, economic development, and municipal roads.  The municipality is governed by a municipal council of elected representatives, which in turn elects a mayor.

Municipal council
The municipal council  of Kornstad was made up of representatives that were elected to four year terms.  The party breakdown of the final municipal council was as follows:

See also
List of former municipalities of Norway

References

Averøy
Hustadvika (municipality)
Former municipalities of Norway
1897 establishments in Norway
1964 disestablishments in Norway